6201 Princess Elizabeth is a preserved steam locomotive in England. It is one of two preserved LMS Princess Royal Class; the other being 46203 Princess Margaret Rose.

Service
6201 was built in November 1933 at the London, Midland & Scottish Railway's (LMS) Crewe Works, the second of its class. It was named after the 7-year-old elder daughter of Prince Albert, Duke of York (later King George VI), Princess Elizabeth (later Queen Elizabeth II). Despite the class officially being named after 6200 Princess Royal, the class received the nickname "Lizzies" after 6201.

After nationalisation in 1948, British Railways (BR) renumbered it 46201. It was withdrawn in October 1962. During its working career for the LMS it wore the famous LMS Crimson Lake livery (this livery is also what it has worn for most of its preserved career), alongside this it even wore LMS black. During its career with BR it wore both brunswick green and black, both of which were lined.

Allocations
The shed locations of 6201/46201 during its career with the LMS and BR on particular dates.

Preservation
Following withdrawal in November 1962, 46201 was bought by the then Princess Elizabeth Locomotive Society straight from service. Initially it was kept at the Dowty Railway Preservation Society's premises at Ashchurch, and then subsequently at the Bulmers Railway Centre in Hereford. When the Bulmers Centre closed in 1993, the loco moved to the Midland Railway Centre, Butterley. An overhaul of the locomotive and tender was started there, but with most work spread between both the Tyseley Locomotive Works and Riley & Son in Bury, the locomotive was not completed until 2002.

After a brief spell at Crewe Heritage Centre in 2009, it was withdrawn from service in July 2012 for a piston and valve examination at the Tyseley Locomotive Works, and after repairs it returned to service on 17 November hauling the Vintage Trains' Cumbrian Mountaineer working the train from Carnforth to Carlisle via the West Coast Main Line and then returned via the Settle-Carlisle line from Carlisle to Crewe where a diesel took the train to Tyseley. It was withdrawn for overhaul at the end of December 2012 having completed its longest period of operation in preservation. It returned to steam in June 2015 after a heavy overhaul and was featured in Tyseley's open weekend on Saturday 27 and Sunday 28 June 2015. It would not be until 2016 that it would return to service on the main line, following which it was based down in London at Southall Railway Centre working rail tours in the southern half of the UK.

On 23 August 2016, Princess Elizabeth hauled its inaugural main line train of the Steam Dreams' Cathedrals Express from London Victoria to Minehead on the West Somerset Railway via Ascot, Reading and Newbury and return.

The repair work was later transferred elsewhere and 6201 was taken to Carnforth for the repairs to be undertook. 6201 returned to service in 2019 and is now presently part of West Coast Railways pool of engines based at Carnforth MPD for trips in the north of Britain.

Diamond Jubilee and Royal Train 
As part of the Diamond Jubilee of Elizabeth II, on 3 June 2012, after arriving in London with a Vintage Trains rail tour from Tyseley heading to Kensington Olympia, Princess Elizabeth'''s whistle signalled the start of the Thames Diamond Jubilee Pageant while the locomotive was standing on Battersea Railway Bridge. The Queen was made aware of the locomotive and waved to the crew on the footplate.

On 11 July, Princess Elizabeth'' hauled the Royal Train from Newport to Hereford and again from Worcester to Oxford as part of the Diamond Jubilee Tour. The loco carried the traditional four-lamp combination (one lamp at the top of the smokebox and three on the buffer lamp irons) used on trains conveying the Head of State, although no headboard was carried. It was only the second time in preservation that the Queen had been conveyed on a steam-hauled Royal Train on the main line, the other occasion in 2002 was also with an LMS locomotive but one of the bigger LMS Coronation Class locomotives No. 6233 Duchess of Sutherland. 6201 was the standby engine for the 2002 royal train. It is believed that it was the first time that the Queen had travelled behind the locomotive that was named after her and the event came just a few weeks before the 50th anniversary of the preservation of the loco, which has been owned by the Princess Elizabeth Locomotive Society longer than under both the LMS and British Railways together which owned the engine from 1933 until 1962 (29 year working life).

Current Status
From 2016, 6201 was located at PRCLT's West Shed at Butterley in Derbyshire.  On 22 February 2018 it was moved to Carnforth MPD for boiler repairs and other general maintenance by West Coast Railways. The move from Butterley to Carnforth was completed by two West Coast Railways Class 37 diesel locomotives.

References

External links

 6201 Princess Elizabeth Locomotive Society Ltd
 Railuk database

6201
Preserved London, Midland and Scottish Railway steam locomotives
P
Individual locomotives of Great Britain
Standard gauge steam locomotives of Great Britain